Triveni is a town in Katari Municipality, Udayapur District, in the Sagarmatha Zone of south-eastern Nepal. The formerly Triveni village development committee was merged to form a new municipality from 18 May 2014. At the time of the 1991 Nepal census, Triveni had a population of 6015 people, living in 1105 individual households.

References

External links
UN map of the municipalities of Udayapur District

Populated places in Udayapur District